The 2022 WAFF U-23 Championship was the third edition of the WAFF U-23 Championship the biennial international age-restricted football championship organized by the West Asian Football Federation (WAFF) for the men's under-23 national teams of West Asia. A total of six teams competed in the tournament.

The tournament was originally going to be held in Iraq from 3 to 18 November 2022, but was relocated to Saudi Arabia due to the 2021–2022 Iraqi political crisis. Jordan, the defending champions, did not take part in the tournament. Saudi Arabia won their first title after defeating Qatar 3–1 in the final.

Host selection
Originally, it was determined that Iraq would host the tournament, as a preparatory competition ahead of the 2023 AFC Asian Cup. However, due to the 2021–2022 Iraqi political crisis, the hosting rights were lifted based on the recommendation issued in this regard by the General Assembly and the Executive Committee of the WAFF during its two recent meetings that were held in the Jordanian capital Amman. On 23 September 2022, the WAFF announced that Saudi Arabia would host the tournament.  Iraq would host the next edition instead.

Teams
Nine teams initially confirmed their participation. On 13 October, both Iraq and Yemen withdrew from the competition. On 20 October, it was announced that Kuwait withdrew from the competition, bringing the final number of teams to six.

Draw
The draw was held on 20 October 2022.

Squads 

Each team had to register a squad of 23 players, three of whom must be goalkeepers.

Match officials
The following referees and assistant referees were appointed for the tournament.

Referees
 Mohamed Bunafoor (Bahrain)
 Osama Ahmad (Jordan)
 Ali Al Ashkar (Lebanon)
 Mohammed Al-Shammari (Qatar)
 Sami Al-Jires (Saudi Arabia)
 Mohammed Al Noori (Syria)
 Wissam Rabie (Syria)

Assistant Referees
 Abdulla Yaqoob (Bahrain)
 Amro Ajaj (Jordan)
 Sabreen Al Abadi (Jordan)
 Mohamad El Hajje (Lebanon)
 Mohammed Al Ghazali (Oman)
 Faisal Al-Shammari (Qatar)
 Faisal Al-Qahtani (Saudi Arabia)
 Oqbah Al Hweij (Syria)
 Roba Zarka (Syria)

Venues

Group stage

Group A

Group B

Knockout stage
In the knockout stage, extra time and penalty shoot-out were be used to decide the winner if necessary (Regulations Articles 10.1 and 10.3).

Bracket

Semi-finals

Fifth place play-off

Third place play-off

Final

Winners

Awards
The following awards were given at the conclusion of the tournament:

Awards
Player of the Tournament
 Ahmed Al-Ghamdi
Golden Glove
 Waseem Ayoub

Goalscorers

References

WAFF Championship tournaments
2022
2022 in Saudi Arabian sport
2022 in Asian football
WAFF